Xu Yinsheng (born 12 May 1938 in Shanghai) is a male former table tennis player from China.

Table tennis career
From 1959 to 1965 he won seven medals in singles, doubles, and team events in the World Table Tennis Championships.

His seven World Championship medals included four gold medals; three in the team event and one in the doubles with Zhuang Zedong at the 1965 World Table Tennis Championships.
He was the coach of the national team in Nagoya 1971 World Championship.

Professional Achievements 
He was president of the International Table Tennis Federation from 1995, following the sudden death of Sven-Olof Hammarlund, till 1999, when he was succeeded by the Canadian Adham Sharara.

He has been inducted in the ITTF Hall of Fame in 2010.

Other significance 
On the eve of the Great Proletarian Cultural Revolution, Xu's advice for playing ping pong was viewed as informative also in the context of commerce, and as endorsed by People's Daily, it was promoted as relevant inspiration for retail workers.

See also
 List of table tennis players
 ITTF Hall of Fame
 List of table tennis players
 List of World Table Tennis Championships medalists

References

External links
 The ITTF Hall of Fame

1938 births
Living people
Chinese male table tennis players
Presidents of the International Table Tennis Federation
Table tennis players from Shanghai